Jean-Marc Dreyfus is a French historian. His PhD thesis (2000) was about Jewish-owned banks in Aryanization and restitution. Dreyfus currently works as a reader in history at Manchester University.

Works

References

Living people
21st-century French historians
Historians of the Holocaust
Academics of the University of Manchester
Year of birth missing (living people)